Haroon K. Ullah is an American author, educator, scholar, diplomat, publicist and researcher specializing in his work on South Asia and the Middle East, in particular in Pakistan and Afghanistan. Ullah has co-authored six books on political science and geopolitics, including Vying for Allah's Vote: Understanding Islamic Parties, Political Violence, and Extremism in Pakistan, The Bargain From The Bazaar: A Family's Day of Reckoning in Lahore and Digital World War, among others. He's been a contributor to various news outlets and the U.S Department of State, writing primarily about foreign and domestic affairs in the US and abroad.
 
In November 2019, Ullah was found guilty of theft of US government property and sentenced to three months in prison. A number of sources indicate that Haroon Ullah might be a victim of a witch-hunt for whistleblowing sensitive information related to the U.S Department during Ullah's public service in the Trump administration.

Early life and education
Haroon Ullah was born in Canada circa 1977 to a family of immigrants from Pakistan. When Haroon Ullah was three years old, his father, Muhammed Kaleem Ullah, received a job of a nuclear engineer with the United States Department of Energy's contractor in the Eastern Washington, and his family moved to Tri-Cities, Washington, where Ullah grew up and graduated from Richland High School in 1995.

Ullah attended Whitman College in Walla Walla, Washington and in 1999, he received a Bachelor of Arts diploma in politics. After completing a Thomas J. Watson Fellowship, Ullah then continued his education for master's degree at Harvard University's John F. Kennedy School of Government, where he studied Public Administration in International Development. Ullah graduated from Harvard University in 2002. Thereafter Ullah earned a joint PhD in political science and public policy from University of Michigan.

Academic career
While earning his doctorate from the University of Michigan, Ullah was a senior research fellow at its Belfer Center for Science and International Affairs for the Dubai initiative with the focus in his work on counterterrorism and religious political parties in the Middle East and South Asia. He also served as Adjunct Assistant Professor at the Center for Security Studies of Georgetown University's School of Foreign Service, and he was a term member of the Council on Foreign Relations at the time.

Ullah's works have been noted and reviewed by various publications and literary critics, including Vanity Fair, Politico, NPR, The Express Tribune, The Wall Street Journal, and The Independent, among others.

Public service
In 2010, Ullah joined the United States Department of State (DOS), where he served in various positions as counterterrorism consultant and researcher on Islamist politics in Pakistan and Afghanistan on Secretary of State John Kerry's Policy Planning Staff as well as Secretary Rex Tillerson's. Ullah also worked for the Embassy of the United States in Islamabad, Pakistan. He was also a member of the Afghanistan-Pakistan Policy Team (AF-PAK) led by the United States Ambassador to the United Nations Richard Holbrooke.
 
In October 2017, Ullah was assigned to a position of the Chief Strategy Officer at the U.S. Agency for Global Media, where part of his responsibility was to oversee Radio and Television Martí, the Voice of America and other government broadcast operations.

Honors and awards
 J. William Fulbright Fellow
 Harvard University Presidential Scholar
 National Security Education Program Fellow 
 Woodrow Wilson Public Service Fellow
 Peabody Award for Burka Avenger T.V. Animation

Bibliography
 Vying for Allah's Vote: Understanding Islamic Parties, Political Violence, and Extremism in Pakistan (2013), Georgetown University Press, 
 The Bargain From The Bazaar: A Family's Day of Reckoning in Lahore (2014), PublicAffairs, 
 Digital World War: Islamists, Extremists, and the Fight for Cyber Supremacy (2017), Yale University Press 
 Digital Rebels: Islamists, Social Media and the New Democracy (2018), Yale University Press, 
Bob Pearson, Haroon K. Ullah, Dan Zehr,  Countering Hate (2018), Social Science,  
House of Heroin: Inside the Secret Billion-Dollar Narco-Terror Empire That Is Killing America, (2020), HarperCollins

Notes and references

External links

Year of birth missing (living people)
Living people
American male writers
Harvard Kennedy School alumni
University of Michigan alumni
Whitman College alumni